Edo Queens is a Nigerian women football club based in Edo State, Nigeria. They play in the top women's football league in Nigeria, the NWFL Premiership.

References

Women's football clubs in Nigeria

Nigeria Women Premier League clubs
NWFL Premiership clubs

Sport in Edo State